Julie Ege (12 November 1943 – 29 April 2008) was a Norwegian actress and model, who appeared in many British films of the 1960s and 1970s.

Early life
Ege was born in Sandnes, the daughter of brickyard worker Marton Ege and Hjørdis Halvorsen. At the age of 15, she began to work as a model. In 1962, she came second in Miss Norway at the age of 18, and subsequently participated in Miss Universe. In 1967, she moved to England to work as an au pair to improve her English, and there also studied at a language school.

Career
She made her film debut in a low-budget Norwegian film Stompa til sjøs (Stompa at Sea). She was a Penthouse Pet of May which landed her a role in 1969's On Her Majesty's Secret Service as Helen, the "Scandinavian girl". She later starred in Hammer Film Productions' Creatures the World Forgot and The Legend of the 7 Golden Vampires. Her other appearances include Every Home Should Have One with Marty Feldman, Not Now, Darling with Leslie Phillips and the Gluttony segment of The Magnificent Seven Deadly Sins.

Ege is probably best remembered for her role in the 1971 comedy hit film Up Pompeii alongside Frankie Howerd. She played Voluptua, a Roman ruler. Her voice, however, was overdubbed by Sheila Steafel (uncredited) for the film. On being introduced to Lance Percival's character, who says "Madame, it's a pleasure", her famous response is "Yes, I know. I've tried it". On 22 August 1971, she presented Ivan Mauger with the European Speedway title trophy at Wembley before a crowd of around 75,000. In a UK TV documentary a few years before her death, she stated that she never minded being labelled a glamour actress and that it had been a good life that basically helped pay the bills. She returned to Norway and did a few films before qualifying as a registered nurse in 1998. She lived in Oslo, where she worked as a nurse.

Personal life
Ege was twice married and divorced in the 1960s and had two daughters. In the '70s she lived with The Beatles' tour roadie Tony Bramwell, and later with the Norwegian author Anders Bye. After her movie and modelling career she finished her secondary education and studied nursing. She later graduated from the University of Oslo where she studied History and English, after which she finished her nursing exams and continued working in the public health sector in Oslo. Her career, as well as her illness is described in detail in her autobiography, Naken (Naked), published in 2002.

Death
She died from breast cancer at the age of 64 on 29 April 2008. She had previously been treated for breast cancer and lung cancer.

Filmography

 Robbery (1967) – Hostess (uncredited)
 Stompa til Sjøs! (1967)
 On Her Majesty's Secret Service (1969) – The Scandinavian girl
 Every Home Should Have One (1970) – Inga Giltenburg
 Up Pompeii (1971) – Voluptua
 Creatures the World Forgot (1971) – Nala – The Girl
 The Magnificent Seven Deadly Sins (1971) – Ingrid (segment "Gluttony")
 Go for a Take (1972) – April
 Rentadick (1972) – Utta Armitage
 The Alf Garnett Saga (1972) – Herself
 Not Now, Darling (1973) – Janie McMichael
 Kanarifuglen (1973) – Kari, flyvertinne
 The Final Programme (1973) – Miss Dazzle
 Craze (1974) – Helena
 The Legend of the 7 Golden Vampires (1974) – Vanessa Buren
 Percy's Progress (1974) – Miss Hanson
 Den siste Fleksnes (1974) – Herself
 The Mutations (1974) – Hedi
 Bortreist på ubestemt tid (1974) – Christina
 The Amorous Milkman (1975) – Diana
 De Dwaze Lotgevallen von Sherlock Jones (1975) – Sondag's secretaresse
 Fengslende dager for Christina Berg (1988) – Krags hustru

Autobiography
 Naken (Naked) H. Aschehoug & Co (W. Nygaard). Oslo 2002.

References

External links
 
 Obituary: The Guardian
 Obituary: The Independent
 Biography in Norwegian, from the Norwegian Biographical Lexicon

1943 births
2008 deaths
People from Sandnes
Actresses from Oslo
Deaths from cancer in Norway
Deaths from breast cancer
Miss Universe 1962 contestants
Norwegian beauty pageant winners
Norwegian female models
Norwegian film actresses
Norwegian nurses
20th-century Norwegian women